Samson ben Isaac of Chinon (c. 1260 – c. 1330) (Hebrew: שמשון מקינון) was a  French Talmudist who lived at Chinon. In Talmudic literature he is generally called after his native place, Chinon (Hebr. קינון), and sometimes by the abbreviation MaHaRShaḲ. He was a contemporary of Peretz Kohen Gerondi, who declared Samson to be the greatest rabbinical authority of his time.As reported by Isaac ben Sheshet, Responsa, No. 157

Works 

Samson was the author of the following works:
 Sefer Keritut (Constantinople, 1515), a methodology of the Talmud divided into five parts:
 Bet Middot, treating of the thirteen rules of R. Ishmael
 Bet ha-Miḳdash, on the rules for deductions by analogy and conclusions a fortiori
 Netibot 'Olam, containing explanations of the 32 rules of R. Eliezer ben Jose ha-Gelili
 Yemot 'Olam, giving the names of the Tannaim and Amoraim, and setting forth a method for deciding between the contrary opinions of two Rabbis
 Leshon Limmudim, explanations of certain halakic decisions.
The "Sefer Keritut," owing to its easy style and its author's great authority, became a classic.
 Ḳonṭres, a commentary on the Talmudic treatises Erubin and Abodah Zarah; mentioned in the Sefer Keritut.
 Bi'ur ha-Geṭ (Vienna MS. No. 48), on the laws concerning divorce.

Samson wrote also responsa, several of which are quoted by Joseph Colon and Solomon ben Adret. According to Gross, Samson was the author of the supercommentary on Ibn Ezra's commentary on the Pentateuch found by Judah Mosconi at Perpignan between 1363 and 1375 (Halberstam MS.). As regards the word (ממרשילאה = "of Marseilles"), which appears in the manuscript after the name Samson of Chinon, Gross believes that Samson settled at Marseilles after the banishment of the Jews from France.

References

 It has the following bibliography:
Azulai, Shem ha-Gedolim, i. 182;
Leopold Zunz, Z. G. p. 44;
S.D. Luzzatto, Halikot Kedem, p. 46;
Halberstam, in Jeshurun, 1866, pp. 167–168; Magazin, iii. 47;
Ernest Renan-Adolf Neubauer, Les Rabbins Français, p. 461;
Henri Gross, Gallia Judaica, pp. 581 et seq.

1260 births
1330 deaths
13th-century French rabbis
French Orthodox rabbis
14th-century French rabbis
People from Chinon